Luc Martin Benkenstein (born 2 November 2004) is a South African cricketer. He made his List A debut on 8 August 2021, for Essex in the 2021 Royal London One-Day Cup.

Benkenstein was born in Durban, South Africa and attended Seaford College in West Sussex.

References

External links
 

2004 births
Living people
Cricketers from Durban
Essex cricketers
South African cricketers
People educated at Seaford College